Jeseník is the name of several places in the Czech Republic:

Jeseník, a town in the Olomouc Region
Jeseník District
Hrubý Jeseník, a mountain range on the Czech-Polish border
Jeseník nad Odrou, a municipality and village in the Moravian-Silesian Region
Hrubý Jeseník, a municipality and village in the Central Bohemian Region